The Tanzimat (see nizam) was a period of reform in the Ottoman Empire that began with the Gülhane Hatt-ı Şerif in 1839 and ended with the First Constitutional Era in 1876.

The Tanzimat era began with the purpose, not of radical transformation, but of modernization, desiring to consolidate the social and political foundations of the Ottoman Empire. It was characterised by various attempts to modernise the Ottoman Empire and to secure its territorial integrity against internal nationalist movements and external aggressive powers. The reforms encouraged Ottomanism among the diverse ethnic groups of the Empire and attempted to stem the tide of the rise of nationalism in the Ottoman Empire.

Historian Hans-Lukas Kieser has argued that the reforms led to "the rhetorical promotion of equality of non-Muslims with Muslims on paper vs. the primacy of Muslims in practice"; other historians have argued that the ability of non-Muslims to assert their legal rights decreased during this period leading to the land seizure and emigration.

Part of the reform policy was an economic policy based on the Treaty of Balta Liman of 1838.

Many changes were made to improve civil liberties, but many Muslims saw them as a foreign influence on the world of Islam. That perception complicated reformist efforts made by the state.

During the Tanzimat period, the government's series of constitutional reforms led to a fairly modern conscripted army, banking system reforms, the decriminalization of homosexuality, the replacement of religious law with secular law and guilds with modern factories. The Ottoman Ministry of Post was established in Constantinople (Istanbul) on 23 October 1840.

Origins
The reforms emerged from the minds of reformist sultans like Mahmud II, his son Abdulmejid I and prominent, often European-educated bureaucrats, who recognised that the old religious and military institutions no longer met the needs of the empire. Most of the symbolic changes, such as uniforms, were aimed at changing the mindset of imperial administrators. Many of the officials affiliated with the government were encouraged to wear a more western style of dress. Many of the reforms were attempts to adopt successful European practices. The reforms were heavily influenced by the Napoleonic Code and French law under the Second French Empire as a direct result of the increasing number of Ottoman students being educated in France. Changes included the elimination of the devshirme system of conscription in favour of universal conscription; educational, institutional and legal reforms; and systematic attempts at eliminating political corruption.

Also, a policy called Ottomanism was meant to unite all the different peoples living in Ottoman territories, "Muslim and non-Muslim, Turkish and Greek, Armenian and Jewish, Kurd and Arab". The policy officially began with the Edict of Gülhane of 1839, declaring equality before the law for both Muslim and non-Muslim Ottomans.

Motives
The ambitious project was launched to combat the slow decline of the empire that had seen its borders shrink and its strength weaken in comparison to the European powers. There were both internal and external reasons for the reforms.

The primary purpose of the Tanzimat was to reform the military by modernizing and taking inspiration from European armies. The traditional Ottoman army, the Janissaries, had fallen far from grace in terms of military prestige and a European-inspired reconstruction was a necessary change to be made. The Ottoman Empire was made up of a multitude of different cultures and the secondary priorities of the Tanzimat reforms were aimed at balancing the social structure that previously favored Muslim subjects. Another vital section of these reforms was the abolishment of Iltizam, or land-tenure agreements. 

Internally, the Ottoman Empire hoped that getting rid of the millet system would lead to direct control of all of its citizens by the creation of a more centralized government and an increase of the legitimacy of Ottoman rule. Another major hope was that being more open to various demographics would attract more people into the empire. There was fear of internal strife between Muslims and non-Muslims, and allowing more religious freedom to all was supposed to diminish this threat. Giving more rights to the Christians was considered likely to reduce the danger of outside intervention on their behalf.

Although the motives for the implementation of Tanzimât were bureaucratic, it was impulsed by liberal ministers and intellectuals like Dimitrios Zambakos Pasha, Kabuli Mehmed Pasha, the secret society of the Young Ottomans, and liberal minded like Midhat Pasha who is also often considered one of the founders of the Ottoman Parliament. Thanks to the emerging internal, financial and diplomatic crises of 1875–1876, Midhat Pasha introduced the constitution of 1876, ending the Tanzimat.

Reforms

The Tanzimât reforms began under Sultan Mahmud II. This was followed by several statutes enacting its policies.

In the edict the Sultan stated that he wished "to bring the benefits of a good administration to the provinces of the Ottoman Empire through new institutions". Among the reforms were:

 the introduction of the first Ottoman paper banknotes (1840);
 the opening of the first post offices of the empire (1840);
 the reorganization of the finance system (1840);
 the reorganization of the Civil and Criminal Code (1840);
 the reorganization of the army and a regular method of recruiting, levying the army, and fixing the duration of military service (1843–44);
 the redesign of Ottoman national anthem and Ottoman national flag (1844);
 the first nationwide Ottoman census in 1844 (only male citizens were counted);
 the first national identity cards (officially named the  identity papers, or informally  (head paper) documents, 1844);
 the institution of a Council of Public Instruction (1845) and the Ministry of Education (Mekatib-i Umumiye Nezareti, 1847, which later became the Maarif Nezareti, 1857);
 the establishment of the first modern universities (1848), academies (1848) and teacher schools (1848);
 the establishment of the Ministry of Healthcare (1850);
 the Commerce and Trade Code (1850);
 the establishment of the Academy of Sciences (Encümen-i Daniş, 1851);
 the establishment of the modern Municipality of Constantinople (1854) and the City Planning Council (1855);
 the Hatt-ı Hümayun of 1856 (called , meaning improvement) promising full legal equality for citizens of all religions (1856);
 various provisions for the better administration of the public service and advancement of commerce;
 the establishment of the first telegraph networks (1847–1855) and railway networks (1856);
 the replacement of guilds with factories;
 the Land Code (1857);
 the decriminalization of homosexuality (1858);
 the establishment of the School of Civil Service, an institution of higher learning for civilians under the Ministry of Internal Affairs, and the School of Economical and Political Sciences (Mekteb-i Mülkiye-i Şahane, 1859)
 the Press and Journalism Regulation Code (1864), among others;
 the establishment of the Imperial Ottoman Lycée at Galatasaray, another institution of higher learning for civilians (1868);
 the Nationality Law of 1869 creating a common Ottoman citizenship irrespective of religious divisions (1869).

The , lit. Noble Decree or Imperial Rescript of Gülhane, was the first major reform in the Tanzimat reforms under the government of sultan Abdulmejid and a crucial event in the movement towards secularization. The decree, named after the rosehouse on the grounds of the Topkapi Palace, abolished tax farming. It also created a bureaucratic system of taxation with salaried tax collectors. This reflects the centralizing effects of the Tanzimat reforms. Additionally, the Edict of  imposed forced military conscription within the administrative districts based on their population size.
 
However, the most significant clause of the  decree was the one enforcing the rule of law for all subjects, including non-Muslims, by guaranteeing the right to life and property for all. This put an end to the  system, which allowed the ruler's servants to be executed or have their property confiscated at his desire. These reforms sought to establish legal and social equality for all Ottoman citizens. The reforms eliminated the millet system in the Ottoman Empire. The millet system created religiously based communities that operated autonomously, so people were organized into societies, some of them often receiving privileges. This clause terminated the privileges of these communities and constructed a society where all followed the same law.

The new reforms called for an almost complete reconstruction of public life in the Ottoman Empire. Under the reconstruction, a system of state schools was established to produce government clerics. Ottomans were encouraged to enroll. Each province was organized so that each governor would have an advisory council and specified duties in order to better serve the territory. The new reforms also called for a modern financial system with a central bank, treasury bonds and a decimal currency. Finally, the reforms implemented the expansion of roads, canals and rail lines for better communication and transportation.

Reactions

The reaction to the edict was not entirely positive. Christians in the Balkans refused to support the reforms because they wanted an autonomy that became more difficult to achieve under centralized power. In fact, its adoption spurred some provinces to seek independence by rebelling. It took strong British backing in maintaining Ottoman territory to ensure that the reforms were instated.

Edict of 1856 and religious freedom

The Reform Edict of 1856 was intended to carry out the promises of the Tanzimat. The Edict is very specific about the status of non-Muslims, making it possible "to see it as the outcome of a period of religious restlessness that followed the Edict of 1839". Officially, part of the Tanzimat's goal was to make the state intolerant to forced conversion to Islam, also making the execution of apostates from Islam illegal. Despite the official position of the state in the midst of the Tanzimat reforms, this tolerance of non-Muslims seems to have been seriously curtailed, at least until the Reform Edict of 1856. The Ottoman Empire had tried many different ways to reach out to non-Muslims. First it tried to reach out to them by giving all non-Muslims an option to apply for Dhimmi status. Having Dhimmi status gave non-Muslims the ability to live in the Ottoman Empire and own property, but this ability was not without special taxes (jizya).

For the "Ottoman ruling elite, 'freedom of religion' meant 'freedom to defend their religion.

Effects

Although the Edict of Gülhane and the Tanzimat provided strong guidelines for society, it was not a constitution and did not replace the authority of the sultan.

Still, the Tanzimat reforms had far-reaching effects overall. Those educated in the schools established during the Tanzimat period included major personalities of the nation states that would develop from the Ottoman Empire, such as Mustafa Kemal Pasha and other leaders and thinkers of the Republic of Turkey and many other personalities from the Balkans, the Middle East and North Africa. The system was ultimately undone by negotiations with the Great Powers following the Crimean War. As part of the Charter of 1856, European powers demanded a much stronger sovereignty for ethnic communities within the empire, differing from the Ottomans, who envisioned equality meaning identical treatment under the law for all citizens. That served to strengthen the Christian middle class, increasing their economic and political power.

The reforms peaked in 1876 with the implementation of an Ottoman constitution checking the autocratic powers of the Sultan.  The details of this period are covered under the First Constitutional Era. Although the new Sultan Abdul Hamid II signed the first constitution, he quickly turned against it.

Some scholars argue that from the Muslim population's traditional Islamic view, the Tanzimat's fundamental change regarding the non-Muslims, from a status of a subjugated population (dhimmi) to that of equal subjects, was in part responsible for the Hamidian massacres and subsequent Armenian genocide. In their view, these were inevitable backlashes from the Muslim community to the legal changes, as the Tanzimat's values were imposed from above and did not reflect those of society.

Effects in different provinces
In Lebanon, the Tanzimat reforms were intended to return to the tradition of equality for all subjects before the law.  However, the Sublime Porte assumed that the underlying hierarchical social order would remain unchanged. Instead, the upheavals of reform would allow for different understandings of the goals of the Tanzimat. The elites in Mount Lebanon, in fact, interpreted the Tanzimat far differently from one another, leading to ethno-religious uprisings among newly emancipated Maronites. As a result, "European and Ottoman officials engaged in a contest to win the loyalty of the local inhabitants — the French by claiming to protect the Maronites; the British, the Druze; and the Ottomans by proclaiming the sultan's benevolence toward all his religiously equal subjects."

In Palestine, land reforms, especially the change in land ownership structure via the Ottoman Land Law of 1858, allowed Russian Jews to buy land, thus enabling them to immigrate there under the first Aliya. In order to boost its tax base, the Ottoman state required Arabs in Palestine, as elsewhere, to register their lands for the first time. As a rule the fellahin didn't trust the ailing regime, fearing that registration would only lead to higher taxation and conscription. Prevailing illiteracy among the fellahin meant in the end that many local mukhtars were able to collectively register village lands under their own name. Thus, they were able to later claim ownership and to sell the local peasants' lands out from under their feet to the new Jewish immigrants, as they themselves relocated permanently to Syria or Turkey. Alternately, rich Christian or Muslim families, the class of the 'Effendis', were able to accumulate large amounts of land which they exploited by themselves or sold on.

In Armenia, the Armenian National Constitution (Ottoman Turkish: "Nizâmnâme−i Millet−i Ermeniyân") of 1863 was approved by the Ottoman government. The "Code of Regulations" consisted of 150 articles drafted by the Armenian intelligentsia and defined the powers of the Armenian Patriarch under the Ottoman millet system and the newly formed "Armenian National Assembly".

Political consequences
Despite progressive intentions, the policy of reform in the form of Tanzimat ultimately failed. The historical circumstances of the reforms, the reasons for this failure and the consequences of the reforms are of interest for historical analysis and are considered by historians all over the world. Zeynep Çelik wrote: "In summary, from 1838 to 1908 the Ottoman Empire staged its final but doomed struggle for survival.

Gallery

See also
Emancipation
Albanian Revolt of 1847
Decline and modernization of the Ottoman Empire
Ottoman military reforms
Edict of Gülhane or Tanzimât  (3 November 1839)
Young Ottomans
Court uniform and dress in the Ottoman Empire

Notes

References

Cited Sources

Further reading
 
 
 
 

 
 
 

 
Politics of the Ottoman Empire
History of social movements
1839 in the Ottoman Empire
1856 in the Ottoman Empire
19th century in the Ottoman Empire
Mahmud II
Abdulmejid I